Yellow Springs or Yellow Spring could refer to:

Places
 Yellow Springs, Ohio
 Yellow Springs, Blair County, Pennsylvania
 Yellow Springs, Chester County, Pennsylvania
 Yellow Spring, West Virginia

In mythology
 Diyu, the Chinese underworld
 Yomi, the Japanese underworld